Amateur Hour is a live comedy album released by Bob Odenkirk and Brandon Wardell released on November 25, 2014 through AST Records.

Track listing

Accolades

References

External links 
 Amateur Hour on iTunes

2014 live albums
Bob Odenkirk albums
Brandon Wardell albums
ASpecialThing Records albums
2010s comedy albums
Stand-up comedy albums
2010s spoken word albums
Spoken word albums by American artists
Live spoken word albums
Live comedy albums